Jaz Rabadia MBE was recognised in the Queens 2016 New Years Honours for services to Sustainability in the Energy Management sector and promoting diversity in STEM (Science, Technology, Engineering & Mathematics)

She was the youngest person in the UK to be awarded the Energy Institute's Chartered Energy Manager status and she now serves on their Council.

Rabadia graduated from City, University of London with a degree in mechanical engineering.

Education 
Rabadia completed an undergraduate BEng in Mechanical Engineering at City, University of London and continued on to complete a postgraduate MSc in Energy, Environment Technology & Economics.

City University now feature Rabadia as a notable Alumni on their website.

Career 
Rabadia's interest in energy management began on a Sainsbury's checkout where she worked part-time whilst studying. As part of her final year dissertation she completed an energy study in the Hendon branch and then went on to join the head office energy team eventually becoming Sainsbury’s Group Energy Manager . She moved to the retail fashion outlet Debenhams and after 2 years at Debenhams, moved to Starbucks as Senior Manager of Energy & Initiatives EMEA. She left Starbucks in September 2019 to join WeWork as their Director of Energy, Sustainability and Social Impact.

Awards and honours 

 2015 – MBE - Member of the Order of the British Empire – for services to sustainability in the energy management sector and promoting diversity in the STEM sectors
 2014 – Young Energy Professional Award – Energy Institute – Winner
 2014 – Energy Buyer of the Year – Energy Awards - Winner 
 2012 - ESTA Energy Manager of the Year – Highly Commended 
 2012 - Asian Women of Achievement Awards – Young Achiever – Highly Commended

References

Year of birth missing (living people)
Living people
English mechanical engineers
Alumni of City, University of London
Members of the Order of the British Empire
British women engineers